The Faculty of Science is one of the faculties of the University of the Witwatersrand, Johannesburg, located in TW Kambule Mathematical Sciences Building on West Campus. The Dean of the Faculty is Professor Nithaya Chetty. The Faculty offers undergraduate Bachelor of Science (BSc) degrees, and postgraduate Honours (BSc Hons.), Masters (MSc) and PhD degrees. The Faculty encompasses the following schools:
Animal, Plant and Environmental Sciences
Biology and Life Sciences
Chemistry
Computational and Applied Mathematics
Computer Science
Geography, Archaeology and Environmental Studies
Geosciences
Mathematics
Molecular and Cell Biology
Physics
Statistics and Actuarial Science

External links
Faculty of Science

References

Science